Technora is an aramid that is useful for a variety of applications that require high strength or chemical resistance. It is a brand name of the company Teijin Aramid. 

Technora was used on January 25, 2004 to suspend the NASA Mars rover Opportunity from its parachute during descent. 

It was also later used by NASA as one of the materials, combined with nylon and Kevlar, making up the parachute that was used to perform a braking manoeuvre during atmospheric entry of the Perseverance rover that landed on Mars on February 18, 2021.

Production
Technora is produced by condensation polymerization of terephthaloyl chloride (TCl) with a mixture of p-phenylenediamine (PPD) and 3,4'-diaminodiphenylether (3,4'-ODA).  The polymer is closely related to Teijin Aramids's Twaron or DuPont's Kevlar. Technora is derived from two different diamines, 3,4'-ODA and PPD, whereas Twaron is derived from PPD alone.  This relatively simple process uses only one amide solvent, and therefore spinning can be done directly after the polymer production.

Physical properties 
 

Technora has a better strength to weight ratio than steel.

Major industrial uses

Automotive and other industries:
 Turbo hoses
 high pressure hoses
 Timing and V-belts
 mechanical rubber goods reinforcement
 Linear tension
 Optical fiber cables (OFC)
 Ram air parachute suspension lines
 ropes, wire ropes and cables
 Umbilical cables
 Electrical mechanical cable (EMC)
 Windsurfing sails
 Hangglider sails
 Drumheads
 Personal protective equipment 
 Poi (performance art)

See also
 Vectran

References

Synthetic fibers
Materials
Organic polymers
Brand name materials
Cables